Hayes is a settlement in Jamaica. It has a population of 10,639 as of 2011.

References

Populated places in Clarendon Parish, Jamaica